Kim Min-Soo (born 14 December 1984) is a South Korean football player who is currently playing for Gwangju FC.

Kim began his football career with National League side Incheon Korail in 2007, and was drafted by K-League side Daejeon Citizen ahead of the 2008 season. He was a bit-part player throughout the year making just 13 appearances, and moved to Incheon United prior to the start of the 2009 season. On 29 November 2010, he moved to Sangju Sangmu Phoenix for military duty.

External links 
 

1984 births
Living people
Hannam University alumni
South Korean footballers
Daejeon Hana Citizen FC players
Incheon United FC players
Daejeon Korail FC players
Gimcheon Sangmu FC players
Gyeongnam FC players
Korea National League players
K League 1 players
K League 2 players
Association football forwards